"Aina mun pitää" is a song by Finnish punk rock band Pertti Kurikan Nimipäivät. The song won Uuden Musiikin Kilpailu (UMK) 2015 and represented Finland in the Eurovision Song Contest 2015.

Background and release
On 7 January 2015, it was leaked through Spotify that Pertti Kurikan Nimipäivät would compete in Uuden Musiikin Kilpailu 2015 with the song "Aina mun pitää", along with the seventeen other competing artists. The official music video was presented on 13 January on both the band's Vevo account and UMK's YouTube channel, and then, the next day, it was released on iTunes.

Composition
"Aina mun pitää" is a song which runs for one minute and twenty-seven seconds. It was written by Pertti Kurikan Nimipäivät's band members. The song's lyrics are about having to engage in daily activities such as washing-up. It is the shortest song to be entered in the history of the Eurovision Song Contest, beating the record previously held by the United Kingdom for their 1957 entry in the contest that clocked in at one minute and fifty-two seconds.

Live performances
The song was performed live for the first time during the first semi-final of Uuden Musiikin Kilpailu 2015, the Finnish national selection for the Eurovision Song Contest. It was later performed as well in the grand final three weeks later where it won the competition. Pertti Kurikan Nimipäivät also performed the song during the first half of the first semi-final of the Eurovision Song Contest 2015 in Vienna. They finished 16th out of 16 countries, failing to qualify for the Grand Final.

Track listing

References

External links

Lyrics in English at YLE Kioski

Eurovision songs of Finland
Eurovision songs of 2015
2015 songs
2015 singles
Finnish-language songs
Sony Music singles